Global weather activity of 2007 profiles the major worldwide weather events, including blizzards, ice storms, tornadoes, tropical cyclones, and other weather events, from January 1, 2007, to December 31, 2007. Winter storms are events in which the dominant varieties of precipitation are forms that only occur at cold temperatures, such as snow or sleet, or a rainstorm where ground temperatures are cold enough to allow ice to form (i.e. freezing rain). It may be marked by strong wind, thunder and lightning (a thunderstorm), heavy precipitation, such as ice (ice storm), or wind transporting some substance through the atmosphere (as in a dust storm, snowstorm, hailstorm, etc.). Other major non winter events such as large dust storms, Hurricanes, cyclones, tornados, gales, flooding and rainstorms are also caused by such phenomena to a lesser or greater existent.

Very rarely, they may form in summer, though it would have to be an abnormally cold summer, such as the summer of 1816 in the Northeast United States of America. In many locations in the Northern Hemisphere, the most powerful winter storms usually occur in March and, in regions where temperatures are cold enough, April.

The events of 2007

January

January 9–12

A low pressure brought up heavy snow and blizzard conditions across the Canadian Prairies. Particularly hard-hit was central Saskatchewan, including the city of Saskatoon. Two people were killed during the blizzard when their car was stuck near a First Nations reserve in Saskatchewan. Saskatoon's Diefenbaker Airport as well as schools were closed.

Prior of hitting the Prairies, the system brought another windstorm to western British Columbia, with gusts exceeding . Additional trees at Stanley Park in Vancouver were uprooted. It also hindered efforts from workers who were trying to repair the inflatable roof of BC Place Stadium (home to the Canadian Football League's BC Lions), which was damaged by winds from a previous storm a few days earlier. A secondary wave following the main storm dumped over 4 inches of snow (10 cm) in the Victoria, Vancouver, and Seattle areas with heavier snow in the mountains. Over 115,000 homes were without power during the storm in B.C.

The storm would later drop some locally heavy amount of snows in parts of northern Ontario and central Quebec with  reported in Saguenay.

A cold front sharply drop temperatures from west to east with some areas getting their coldest days of the season across the Canadian and U.S. plains. The cold air later reached the eastern half of the continent at the end of the week.

January 12–24

Following a prolonged period of mild weather, a series of winter storms produced several waves of damaging freezing rain across the Midwest of the United States and central Canada from the 12th to the 16th causing the deaths of 85 people as of January 20. Several thousands of customers from Texas to New England lost power, some for several days. Some areas received as much as 4 inches of ice (100 mm).

Oklahoma and Missouri were declared disaster areas as they were the most hard hit states from the storms. Areas from Utah to New Brunswick received heavy amounts of snow from the 13th to the 16th. The storm was followed by an intense period of cold across most of the continent from California to Newfoundland and Labrador.

Additional waves of precipitation have affected the south half of the United States from the 16th to 18th from Texas to North Carolina, while another winter storm, called a weather bomb affected portions of New Brunswick, Quebec and Maine on the 19th and 20th with near blizzard conditions. Portions of eastern Quebec received as much as 32 inches of snow (80 cm) in just over 12 hours

A total of 85 deaths across 12 U.S. states and three Canadian provinces, and caused hundreds of thousands of residents across the U.S. and Canada to lose electric power.

Winter storms contributed to deaths in traffic collisions: 14 in Missouri, 8 in Iowa, 12 in Texas, 2 in Minnesota, 4 in New York, 1 in Maine, 1 in Indiana, 4 in Michigan, 3 in Arkansas, 1 in Quebec, 1 in Ontario, 1 in Nova Scotia, 2 in North Carolina, 2 in Kansas, 4 in Nebraska and 25 in Oklahoma. A crash near Elk City, Oklahoma, killed 7 occupants who were inside a minivan when it collided with a tractor-trailer during the storm.

Another winter storm affected the central and southern Plains from the 19th to the 21st bringing snow and ice for most of the area with accumulations that topped off at about 4 to 10 inches of snow (10–25 cm). It also brought a light wintry mix across the Ohio Valley and the mid-Atlantic states on the 21st with little accumulation. Newfoundland and Labrador was the last region affected by the series of storms on the 23rd and 24th.

January 14

Per was the name of a powerful storm with hurricane winds which hit the west coast of Sweden and Norway on the morning of January 14, 2007. In Sweden six people died from the storm and approx. 300,000 households were left without electricity.

January 15–19

A major European windstorm gave heavy amounts of snow across portions of Scotland. Most areas of western Europe from Great Britain to the Czech Republic have experienced damaging winds. Boat, rail and air traffic have been heavily affected, while several hundreds of flights from London, Berlin, Amsterdam, Vienna, Prague and Paris have been delayed or canceled. U.S. Secretary of State Condoleezza Rice shortened her European trip due to the strong winds. Millions of residents were without power including 1 million in the Czech Republic. As of 9:00 pm GMT on January 21, Kyrill had caused 47 fatalities. They were- 13 in Germany, 11 in United Kingdom, 7 in Ireland, 6 in The Netherlands, 4 in Poland, 3 in the Czech Republic 3, 1 in France, 1in Belgium and 1 in Austria.

Germany had 3 tornadoes on February 22 and more tornadoes were confirmed from Poland.

January 23–27
A snowstorm affected a large area of western and central Europe, including France, Great Britain, Austria and Germany bringing locally heavy snow accumulations and ice which disrupted air and train travel in Berlin, Stuttgart and London. Some areas in the Alps region received as much as 1 meter of snow (40 inches). Three people were killed in Germany due to accidents caused by the storm. Over 5,000 motorists were stranded in a highway in eastern France due to the heavy snow amounts. Scattered power outages were reported with central France being affected the most with nearly 85,000 homes without power.

On the 27th abolut 40,000 people had been affected by flooding in Bolivia and Peru

February

February 1–2
A winter storm crossed through the southern United States, with a mix of winter weather. Several inches of snow fell across parts of Arkansas, Georgia, the Carolinas and Tennessee with scattered sleet and freezing rain farther south. Anywhere from 1–4 inches of snow fell across Tennessee and Arkansas, with lighter amounts in the Carolinas.

February 1–12
A major lake effect snow event, titled Lake Storm "Locust", occurred across the Great Lakes regions for several days. Areas most affected by the localized heavy burst of snows were just east of Georgian Bay area near Parry Sound, east of Lake Huron near Wiarton, in western Michigan, and in north central New York.

A state of emergency was declared in Oswego County due to the intense snow. Portions of central Ontario received  of snow over the period while heavy accumulations were also reported in western Michigan just off the shores of Lake Michigan.

On February 1, a snow squall just east of Oshawa, Ontario on the north shore of Lake Ontario caused a 15-vehicle pileup including a tractor trailer which burst into flames. Two people were killed in the event. There were no reported deaths related to the event in New York State. However, 20 were killed in other states due to cold weather. The event was very localized; areas outside the narrow bands received little or no snow.

February 7–9
A winter storm blanketed parts of the United Kingdom including the City of London disrupting travel all across the city including numerous flights cancelled from all airports and several motorists were stranding on area roads. Service on the Underground subway system was also affected with several stations been closed. Many schools were also closed for one or two days. The heavy snowfall started life as a low-pressure system sitting out in the Atlantic Ocean, at the time the UK was under the influence of a cold northerly wind. The low pressure system tracked towards the UK on the evening of February 7 and turned readily to snow as it hit the cold air. The snow turned back to rain across southern and western regions, but much of Wales, the Midlands and the south-east had significant snowfalls on the 8th. The West Midlands in particular was badly hit, with up to  reported over high ground – the most snow to fall in this region for 15 years. On the 9th, the low pressure over France tracked further north than forecast, bringing more heavy snow for the Midlands and Wales. This caused additional travel disruption as the roads were not gritted and heavy gridlock formed on many of the roads. The snow began to thaw over the weekend and in turn caused some localised flooding.

February 12–16

A major winter storm affected a large area of eastern North America from Nebraska to the Canadian Maritimes. Burlington, Vermont set a 24-hour snowfall record, with 25.3 inches. Twelve to sixteen inches (30 to 41 cm) of snowfall and blizzard conditions in central Illinois cancelled classes at the University of Illinois at Urbana–Champaign for two days, the first time classes had been cancelled since 1979.

Large cities including Cleveland, Hamilton, Syracuse, Rochester, Burlington, Quebec City and Sherbrooke received amounts well in excess of 1 foot of snow (30 cm). The city of Hamilton received local snowsqualls bombarding in from Lake Ontario with a north-east wind which dumped over 2 feet of snow (75 cm) in some parts of the city.

Mixed precipitation fell across the southern Ohio Valley and the Interstate 95 corridor from Virginia to Boston, including New York City, Washington, D.C., and Philadelphia.

The storm has been blamed for 35 deaths across 13 states and three Canadian provinces.

February 19–24
Heavy amounts were reported in the western Avalon Peninsula of the province. The storm previously affected portions of Nova Scotia and dumped locally heavy amounts of snow due to sea effects coming from the Atlantic Ocean and the Bay of Fundy. A new storm on the 23rd and 24th dumped an additional in the capital with freezing rain, while heavier amount fell just to the west.

February 21–26
Late on the 23rd, it moved onto the central High Plains and organized into a major storm that spread snow from eastern Colorado northeast into the Upper Midwest and Great Lakes region, and ice from Iowa to northern Indiana. The system then split into two with the northern branch dissipating due to a blocking ridge of high pressure which prevented the blizzard from moving north into Canada. The storm continued into the Mid-Atlantic on the 25th, dropping snow as far south as the Washington, D.C. area.

Sustained winds of  resulted in severe blowing and drifting in some of these locations. 10 people were killed in traffic accidents during the storm including 8 in Wisconsin, one in Ontario and one in Kansas. A forty car pileup resulted in the closing of Interstate 70 between Denver and Goodland, Kansas. This storm caused massive delays and cancellations at Chicago O'Hare and Midway Airport. At one point, 250,000 customers in Iowa were without power. Some people got their power back quickly, for others it took quite a while. The storm then moved into the mid-Atlantic states, where up to 8 inches accumulated. Blizzard or winter storm warnings were in effect at one point in Kansas, Nebraska, South Dakota, Iowa, Minnesota, Wisconsin, Illinois, Indiana, Michigan, Ohio, Pennsylvania, Maryland, Virginia, West Virginia and Washington, D.C.

The storm also brought severe thunderstorms and tornadoes from Kansas to Alabama, hitting Arkansas especially hard, where Dumas was heavily damaged by a tornado.

February 22–23
A snowstorm moved across Scandinavia in northern Europe dumping heavy amounts of snow. The storm was blamed for one fatality in Denmark, while hundreds of flights from Copenhagen and Sweden were cancelled. Numerous motorists were stranded due to drifts that reached locally 3-meters high. A sports hall in Thisted,  Denmark also collapsed but the building was vacant.

The 2007 Mozambican flood began in late December 2006 when the Cahora Bassa Dam overflowed from heavy rains on Southern Africa. It worsened in February 2007 when the Zambezi River broke its banks, flooding the surrounding areas in Mozambique. The Chire and Rivubue rivers have also flooded. Avbout 80,600 were evacuated. There were 29 known and 10 unconfirmed deaths in Mozambique.

February 27 – March 2
Another major storm moved into the Pacific Northwest coast on the 27th, adding to the several feet of snow already recorded in the Cascades and Sierra Nevada in the previous few days. It impacted the Upper Midwest, the northern Plains, the Great Lakes and Quebec regions with heavy snow, sleet, freezing rain and high winds by March 1 and 2, in addition to bringing more severe thunderstorms to the South. Already, numerous tornadoes were reported in Alabama, Georgia, Missouri and Kansas including six killers. A deadly tornado struck Enterprise High School, killing 8 students on
March 1. On March 2, over 2 inches of rain fell in New York City and snow, sleet and freezing rain fell in the interior Northeast.

Omaha, Nebraska was under a blizzard warning for the first time in 9 years, with much of the city receiving a foot (30.5 cm) or more of snow, and thunder snow as reported at the beginning of the storm. Wind speeds in Omaha were clocked as high as 58 miles per hour, creating snow drifts in outlying areas up to 8 feet depth. The entire state of Iowa was placed under a State of Emergency by Governor Chet Culver while large stretches of Interstate 80 were shut down. The National Guard came into the area to bring generators to restore power until utility lines were repaired.

Portions of Ontario and Quebec from Sault Ste. Marie to Montreal (including Sudbury, North Bay and Ottawa) received between 6 and 10 inches of snow (15–25 cm) on March 2. 80,000 customers lost power in the province with localized heavy amount across the Appalachians. It forced City police to close the Gardiner Expressway on March 5.

The storm with the tornadoes and snow was blamed for 39 deaths including 10 in Alabama, 1 in Missouri, 9 in Georgia, two in Manitoba, two in Ontario, one in Minnesota, three in Michigan, one in Nebraska, four in North Dakota, one in Massachusetts and four in Wisconsin.

March

March 3–4
Portions of northern China and Mongolia were hit by the worst winter storm in over 50 years. The provinces of Liaoning and Shenyang had adopted emergency measures in able to cope with the storm which shut down numerous highways and canceled numerous flights while disrupting train service. Strong winds created snow drifts of up to 2 meters deep.

Rescue ships had to assist a large group of fisherman on the Yellow Sea following a storm tide. Two people were killed in Tianjin when a storm surge collapsed several warehouses. As much as  fell in the province in Heilongjiang.

March 14–15
Jordan's second winter storm of the season shut down most roads, schools and businesses across much of the country due to accumulations exceeding  including the capital of Amman.

Much of the Middle East usually have little or no snow during the winters due to much warmer conditions caused by the moderate sea effects from the Mediterranean Sea. However  of snow fell in a storm 2004, which was the worst since 1950.

March 16–17

The north eastern US snow event
A heavy nor'easter caused severe Precipitation that started as rain across the region during the evening of the 15th, but as colder air moved in aloft, precipitation changed quickly to snow in The Poconos around Midnight EDT on the 16th and in Berks County and the Lehigh Valley around 7 am EDT. Farther to the south, the surge of cold air was confined to a more shallower layer and precipitation changed to sleet around the Greater Philadelphia Metropolitan Area between 6 am and 9 am EDT. Precipitation continued as mainly sleet across the greater Philadelphia through the evening. The nor'easter caused heavy sleet to fall across the greater Philadelphia metropolitan area, heavy snow and sleet also fell across Berks County, the Lehigh Valley and heavy snow hit the Poconos on both the 16th into the early morning of the 17th.

The winter storm caused scores of accidents. Various vehicles rolled over, slid off roads, slid into each other, slammed into guardrails and fishtailed. The afternoon and evening commute slowed to a crawl. In the Greater Philadelphia Metropolitan Area, about 265 schools dismissed early and more than 60 community events were either cancelled or postponed on the 17th. A few schools also closed on the 16th, but most of the others had early dismissals and many after school activities were postponed. Some state offices and county courts also closed early and several municipalities declared snow emergencies over the March 16 to 18.

The winter storm wreaked havoc at Philadelphia International Airport had most flights on the 16th cancelled and it took a couple of days for flights to return to normal. The largest impact of the winter storm within Philadelphia was the cancellation of most of the 1,200 scheduled flights at the Philadelphia International Airport. About 1,000 people were stranded at the airport the night of the 16th. Passengers on about 15 U.S. Airways planes sat on the tarmac for over four hours before gates became available to deplane them. Operations resumed on the 17th, but U.S. Airways still had to cancel about one quarter of its flights because the weather prevented crews and planes from arriving in Philadelphia. About 100 travelers slept at the airport on the night of the 18th. Normal operations resumed on the 19th.

The Pennsylvania Interscholastic Athletic Association postponed several state playoff high school basketball games. A couple of Saint Patrick's Day parades scheduled for Saturday the 17th were also postponed on the 16th. The Philadelphia Flyers hockey team was forced to fly out of Atlantic City International Airport on the 17th. The horse racing card at Philadelphia Park was also cancelled for three days.

In Berks County and the Lehigh Valley, the snow mixed with and changed over to sleet during the later afternoon and the first half of the evening before it went back to all snow. Precipitation ended early in the day on the 17th (before 3 am EDT) as mainly snow in all areas. Elsewhere in Bucks County, portions of the Northeast Extension of the Pennsylvania Turnpike near Quakertown were stalled when two tractor-trailers collided in the southbound lanes at 2 pm EDT. A six-mile back-up occurred. About 1,900 homes and businesses lost power in Newtown after a vehicle struck a pole.

The sleet forced the closure of the eastbound lanes of the Vine Expressway within the city for about half an hour between the Schuylkill Expressway and Interstate 95 for its removal. In Montgomery County, in Montgomery Township, an accident on Pennsylvania State Route 309 and Taylor Road badly injured one person. In Towamencin Township, two accidents resulted in two injuries occurring.

In Chester County, the state police reported 46 accidents in the central part of the county, but only one reported injury. A woman was hospitalized after a crash on Pennsylvania Route 113 in Phoenixville. Several businesses in the county closed early. In Berks County, in Union Township one vehicle slid off a road and landed upside down in a creek. The driver was treated for non-threatening life injuries. A serious accident occurred on Old U.S. Route 22 in Lenhartsville.

The Lehigh Valley had a number of serious accidents on Interstate 78. In Lehigh County, a tractor-trailer jack-knifed near Pennsylvania Route 100 at Fogelsville and closed the interstate from 330 p.m. EDT through 515 p.m. EDT. Both southbound lanes of the Pennsylvania Turnpike Northeast Extension were closed from 155 p.m. EDT through 420 p.m. EDT after two tractor-trailers and a car collided in Lower Milford Township. Many flights at the Lehigh Valley International Airport were delayed, a couple were cancelled.

Commuter buses bringing workers home from New York City had long delays. In Northampton County, a tractor-trailer jackknifed on the eastbound lanes of Interstate 78 about 4 pm EDT near the Pennsylvania Route 33 junction. All lanes were not reopened until 545 p.m. EDT. In Moore Township, a school bus collided head-on with a car. Both drivers, but no children were injured.

In Lower Mount Bethel Township, Pennsylvania, a Jeep Cherokee slid into a home on Pennsylvania State Route 611 and injured the driver. A Ford Explorer driver was injured after the vehicle struck a tree in Wind Gap. Problems on Lehigh Valley roadways continued long after the snow and sleet ended. A driver was injured on U.S. Route 22 in Whitehall Township (Lehigh County) when ice chunks from a tractor-trailer hit their vehicle. In Upper Macungie Township, Pennsylvania, ice chunks that flew off a Wal-Mart tractor-trailer cracked the windshield and dented the hood of a vehicle on Interstate 78 near the Pennsylvania Route 100's exit.

In the Poconos, many shopping malls and sports complexes closed early. In Monroe County, a flipped over truck snarled traffic on U.S. Route 209 and Pennsylvania Route 33. A jack-knifed tractor-trailer on eastbound Interstate 80 near Stroudsburg snarled the evening commute to a crawl.

Northeastern U.S. snow depths

The storm event in Canada
A strong high pressure system moved across nearby parts of Canada and supplied a fresh supply of cold air into the region.

Hundreds of traffic accidents occurred across the northeast and Canada including one involving a vehicle from George W. Bush's motorcade in Washington, D.C..

The metrological cause of the storm
The winter storm was caused by a nor'easter low pressure system that developed on a cold front that moved through the area on the 15th. Prior to that, unseasonably mild air helped push high temperatures as high as the 70s.

Meanwhile, the low pressure system formed over South Carolina and Georgia on the morning of the 16th and moved northeast. As central pressures go, this was not particularly a powerful system; it was only 996 millibars the morning of the 17th. What contributed to the event, was the strong high pressure system (about 1040 millibars the morning of the 16th). It supplied the fresh cold air needed to change the precipitation over to sleet and freezing rain and increased the pressure gradient (and consequently the wind) between itself and the developing nor'easter low pressure system.

Fatalities
The only serious reported traffic fatality from the storm in Eastern Pennsylvania occurred in Bucks County. An 18-year-old girl from Plumstead Township was killed when her vehicle crossed the center line of an icy Durham Road and collided with a dump truck on the 16th.

Ten people were killed by the storm, all in traffic accidents. This includes six in New Jersey, three in Pennsylvania and one in Maryland.

March 26–29
A storm moved onto the coast on March 26, dropping up to 2 feet of snow in the Sierra Nevada. The storm moved across the Intermountain West on the 27th and developed into a major winter storm across the northern and central Rockies and northern High Plains. Many of the western valleys, from the Wasatch Front through the valleys of Wyoming, onto the Plains of Wyoming and Montana, saw about 6–12 inches of snow, with 1–2 feet in the mountains from the 27th through the 29th. Up to 3 feet fell in the Wasatch Range and Bighorn Mountains. The storm was concentrated around south-central Montana and north-central Wyoming, where such cities as Sheridan and Billings and surrounding areas could see 1–2 feet of snow. Throughout the mountains and on the Plains (including Saskatchewan and Manitoba), this snow was accompanied by strong winds, leading to localized near-blizzard to blizzard conditions.

April

April 2–7

A late season winter storm dumped a large swath of snow from North and South Dakota, eastward through Minnesota, Wisconsin and into Upper Michigan. Up to 9 inches of snow fell near Bismarck, North Dakota, 11 inches in Brainerd, Minnesota, and areas near Hurley, Wisconsin received 18 inches. Parts of Upper and northern Michigan then saw a major Lake Effect event over approximately five days.  Painesdale, Michigan received 65 inches of snow and the National Weather Service in Marquette received 47 inches, shattering most previous April snowfall records for that city.  Lake effect also affected the Lake Erie region,  cancelling the series between the Cleveland Indians and Seattle Mariners baseball teams in Cleveland, and prompting a move of the next series with the Los Angeles Angels of Anaheim from Jacobs Field to Miller Park in Milwaukee.

In northern New England, the storm hit on Wednesday afternoon and left behind up to a foot and a half of snow, sleet, and freezing rain. Over 180,000 homes lost power, mostly due to broken tree limbs snapping wires. The storm has caused at least one death.

Numerous accidents were reported across the provinces including one involving a firetruck. Two people were killed in accidents across the province.

On the back side of the storm, persistent heavy flurries gave additional accumulations of a few inches across most of Ontario and Quebec.

April 8

April 9–13
For the second time in a week, the Northern Plains of the United States was affected by a late-season April winter storm. Snowfall totals of 8 inches was reported in Fairmont, Minnesota while 9 inches was recorded in Victory, Wisconsin. 6 people died in snowfall related traffic accidents near Green Bay, Wisconsin. 5.1 inches fell in Muskegon, Michigan, on April 11, setting a snowfall record for that date.
The storm did shut down some school across Nova Scotia on the 13th.

April 13–16

A major nor'easter struck the eastern half of North America bringing heavy rains, floods, storm surges and damaging wind across coastal areas. Flooding did occur across many suburbs of the region as well as in other areas of the East Coast from Maine to Virginia. In Cape Elizabeth, Maine, an 80 mph wind gust was recorded, along with 30-foot waves that battered the coast. In New York, the National Guard assisted the emergency procedures while Maine, West Virginia and New Jersey declared state of emergencies. Several tornadoes struck the Carolinas killing at least 1 in South Carolina. Additional tornadoes struck northern Texas on the 13th. Also Wildfires were reported in Georgia and Florida, caused by strong winds from Nor'easter.

In Quebec as much as 160 000 Hydro-Québec customers lost power from the Outaouais to the Quebec City region while several schools were closed north of Montreal. An additional 17 000 households serviced by Hydro One and Hydro Ottawa suffered power outages in Eastern Ontario
In the U.S. over 300,000 customers lost power from Maryland to Maine including 55 000 in New York, 50 000 in Pennsylvania, 43 000 in Connecticut, 46 000 in New Hampshire, 17 000 in Maine, 30 000 in Maryland, 25 000 in Vermont and 12 000 in Massachusetts.

Numerous flights were delayed or canceled from New York, Boston and Philadelphia as well as the Canadian airports of Montreal, Ottawa and Quebec City. In Boston, the annual Boston Marathon when ahead of schedule despite howling winds and pouring rain as well as cold temperatures.

Three people were killed in South Carolina, five in total in Texas and Kansas and five in Quebec.

April 23–24
A strong low pressure system affected southern portions of the Rockies including the higher elevations of Colorado. Areas west of Denver received a much as 26 inches of snow (near Evergreen) with several other reports of 12 inches or more. while severe weather affected eastern portions of the state.

May

May 4–5
While much of the Central Plains received heavy rain and damaging tornadoes, regions in higher elevations across the Rockies, including Colorado, Wyoming, Utah, Nebraska and Idaho, received snow, locally a major winter storm.

May 9
Also on May 9, a strong tornado struck Bebejia, Chad destroying the town and killing 14 people.

May 15–16
Heavy rain storms hit Poland on May 15 and 16, causing heavy flooding in the south and east of the country. 8 inches of rain also fell in Gdańsk causing heavy localised flooding until the 17th.

On Sunday, May 16, the rivers in Malopolska had reached alarming leavels in 6 locations, a state of flood alert was issued in 23 places. Flood alerts were announced in the communities of Liszki,  Skawina, Cracow, Rzezawa, Łapanów, Bochnia, Borzęcin Gnojnik, Brest-Litovsk,  Bobowa and Gorlice.

May 20–23
Between May 20 and 23, emergency services evacuated the commune of Wilków along with some other parts of the Lublin area as the river Vistula broke its banks. Many people did not want to leave their homes and were forcibly removed for their own safety. The river Wisła fell by 12 cm of rain fell in Sandomierz, but the level of water grew alarmingly in Lublin, Liszki and Łódź. A person was killed in Lubin as he fell into an overflowing stream near their home.

May 22 saw Warszawa’s opera hall, some schools, kindergartens and babies’ nurseries closed in areas at risk of flooding. Local and state officials also asked for the expertise of German specialists who are experienced in carrying out the mass evacuation. Several hectares of land in the commune of Wilków was flooded by the Vistula River. Wrocław was partly flooded as the river Oder broke a dyke and the district Kozanów flooding an area of about 80 hectares.

June

June 3–4

On June 3, a 3rd wave of flooding hit both Wilków, Liszki and Lubin as more powerful storms have passed over many places in the country and brought heavy rainfall. Most dykes and levees had been upgraded mostly held out in the Lublin area. The governor of Mazovia, Jacek Kozlowski, introduced a flood alert for all the municipalities and counties south of Mazovia.

Between June 3 and 4 dangerous levels of flooding returned to Lower Silesia. Local officials declared flood emergency in 16 counties and the city of Legnica The Polish Hydrological Service also confirmed that the river Oder would probably be involved in the second wave of climactic flooding.

June 7
On June 7 the districts of Tarnów had closed the locks in the drainage ditches as flooding occurred several settlements in the municipality of Wierzchosławice. In the municipality Gromnik a series of landslides occurred, with some threateningly the high voltage poorer lines in Ryglice.

June 12
On June 12, Polish Premier Donald Tusk visited a flooded village as the water began to subside.

June 11–13
A major winter storm occurred in portions of Argentina and Chile creating hazardous traveling through several areas. Hardest hit areas were in the higher elevation along the Chile and Argentina borders. One of the main roads connecting the two counties was fully shut down while numerous trucks were left stranded in the area. The combination of heavy snow and hurricane-force winds force the shutdown of schools and businesses in Bariloche a popular resort destination in the country. Accumulations of several meters of snow fell in the Cristo Redentor Tunnel mountain pass.

June 20–21
A winter storm affected portions of the southeastern coast of Australia and South Island, New Zealand. Heavy snows fell in the mountain regions of the Blue Mountains west of Sydney as well as Oberon and Bathurst while it disrupted air travel in Otago, New Zealand while causing numerous accidents across the area due to slippery conditions.

July

July 1–4
A winter storm brushed the Antarctic Peninsula with hurricane-force winds in early July 2007. Other weather stations in the Antarctic Peninsula reported similar effects.

July 9

An interaction with an area of low pressure systems across Argentina during the July 6, 7 and 8, 2007, and the entry of a massive polar cold snap made as a result the worst winter of Argentina in almost forty years, where severe snowfalls and blizzards affected the country The cold snap advanced from the south towards the central zone of the country during Friday, July 6, continuing its displacement towards the north during Saturday, July 7 and Sunday, July 8. On Monday July 9, the simultaneous presence of very cold air, above the average levels of the atmosphere as in the surface, gave place to the occurrence of snowfalls even in localities where snow is rare. This phenomenon left at least 23 people dead.

It was the third time that a phenomenon like this happened in the country. The first time was in 1912 and the second one was in 1918, occasion in which even there was major volume of snow.

July 21–22
Central Banbury is flooded by heavy rain. The flooded area included the bus and railway station.

September

September 13–16

The 2007 floods of Africa were reported by the UN to be one of the worst periods of flooding in recorded history. The flooding started with rains on September 14, 2007, and lasted for 3 days. 14 countries had been affected in the continent of Africa, 250 people were reported to have been killed by the flooding and 2,500,000 were affected. The UN had issued warnings of water borne diseases and locust infestations.

In Ghana 400,000 were homeless with at least 20 people dead and crops and livestock had been washed away over the 3 day event.

George Azi Amoo – Ghana's national disaster management co-ordinator

64 people were reported killed in the Sudan. 17 people were reported dead Ethiopia. In the Afar Region, the Awash River flooded caused a dam to collapse. Around 4,500 people were stranded, surrounded by water. 150,000 people were displaced in Uganda and 21 reported dead. 170 schools were under water. 18 people were reported dead and 500 residences were washed away by floods in Rwanda. Mali saw 5 bridges had collapsed and 250 residences were washed away. 33 people were reported dead in Burkina Faso, 12 people were reported dead in Kenya and  Togo reported that 20 people were reported dead

November

November 1–5

The highest gust was recorded in the Wreckhouse area in Newfoundland and Labrador where gusts reached . Nearly 200,000 customers in Atlantic Canada alone lost power during the height of the storm. In the northwesternmost edge of the system, Noel produced a narrow swath of snow (thus the first major winter storm across those areas) which affected areas of Maine, as well as Happy Valley – Goose Bay, Newfoundland and Labrador and eastern Quebec from near Rivière-du-Loup to Sept-Îles including Rimouski, Amqui, Cap Chat, Port-Cartier and portions of Baie-Comeau and Forestville. Nearly 20,000 Hydro-Québec customers were without power mostly due to a damaged transmission line in the Minganie region. The storm prompted election director to extend the voting period for school board elections, which the storm disrupted.

November 5–7
The first lake-effect snow event around the Great Lakes occurred as cold air swept through the region. Significant snow also fell in western New York in the typical snowbelt regions.

November 7–8

A European windstorm crosses over Scotland and plunges into the mouth of the North Sea, to the west of Norway, where its strong winds push large bodies of water Southeast, towards coastal regions in England and the Netherlands. The tidal surge puts both nations on red alert as the English evacuate some coastal villages and close the Thames Barrier. The Dutch close the Eastern Scheldt storm surge barrier and the enormous Maeslant barrier in order to prevent massive flooding as the storm mimics the situation that caused the devastating North Sea flood of 1953. For the first time since 1976, the entire Dutch coastline is put on alert and is closely monitored by officials. The tidal surge turned out to be too weak to cause any significant damage to the strong Dutch coastal defenses. In England, only minor flooding occurred.

November 11–13
A powerful storm in the Black Sea sank or damaged 5–10 ships, one of them, the oil tanker MT Volganeft-139, broke apart spilling most of its 1.3 million gallons of crude oil into the sea. The storm killed 3 crew members and the resulting oil spill killed over 30,000 birds and an unknown number of fish. Several merchant ships carrying over 6,000 tons of sulphur also sank: the M/S Nekhichevan and Kovel followed by M/S Volnogorsk when it collided with the sunken Kovel; a Georgian cargo carrying steel products also sank.

Further to the west in southeastern Europe, the storm dumped exceptional amounts of snow over parts of Austria with local reports of over a meter of snow. Some meteorologists mentioned that the weather that took place in the Alps was a once in every 30 to 50 year occurrence. The storm contributed to the closure of several mountain roads and an increased risk of avalanches over the region. The country's avalanche warning system raised its alarm level to the second-highest.

November 15–17
A cold front pushed through eastern North America early on the 15th, bringing lake-effect snow to the typical snowbelt regions, dropping up to a foot of snow in the snow belts. The snow continued into the 17th, with snow developing across the northern Appalachians, central and eastern Quebec and northern Maine. Poor weather conditions were responsible for at least 2 deaths due to traffic accidents in Quebec on Route 175 south of Saguenay and on Highway 20 in Rimouski. Further east, significant rainfalls affected portions of the Gaspésie region with the towns of Matane, Cap-Chat and Sainte-Anne-des-Monts declaring disaster areas due to extensive flooding.

November 20–28
A series of low pressure systems traveled across the central and eastern sections of North America, the Great Lakes and eastern Canada. While some of the systems dumped several inches of snow across portions of eastern Ontario and central Quebec on the 20th and 21st, the strongest storm produced the first major winter storm for southern Ontario and southern Quebec while also affecting portions of central and eastern Quebec and northern New Brunswick. Freezing rain and ice pellets affected areas along Highway 401 from east of London to Brockville as well as areas just east of Montreal.

Several flights coming out of Toronto, Montreal, and Ottawa were affected. At one point during Ontario Provincial Police reported on average one motor-vehicle accident every minute.  Activities surrounding the Canadian Football League's Grey Cup Match in Toronto had to be brought indoors or canceled due to the poor conditions. The storm is responsible for at least two death in Ontario including west of Renfrew on Highway 17 and on Highway 400 in Toronto. Sûreté du Québec reported well over a hundred vehicles running off the road only around Montreal and Montérégie, and a dozen more serious accidents in Mauricie. 20,000 Hydro-Québec were affected in total by power outages, with the most of them east of Montreal

During November 25 and 26, heavy rain and snow induced flooding devastates Serbia, especially the towns of  Crni Marko and Novi Pazar

December

November 30 – December 2

Preceding the large winter storm, a significant winter storm affected portions of the Canadian Maritimes and Newfoundland and Labrador on December 2. Initially a weak disturbance, it produced significant lake-effect snows across the traditional snow belts on the southern shores of Lakes Superior, Michigan, Huron and Ontario as well as Georgian Bay. The storm registered a minimum of 957 mb off the Atlantic Coast two days later. Due to heavy snow, strong winds, sleet and freezing rain, over 100,000 customers in Newfoundland lost power, with a large portion of the capital St. John's being blacked out for several hours. In the Bonavista Peninsula, several transmission lines and support structures collapsed and telephone service was also disabled for a certain period including cellphone coverage. Some residents remained without power for over a week.

December 1–5 (eastern and central North America)

A low-pressure system developed across the southwestern United States moved across the central parts of North America on December 1, becoming a Colorado Low with an initial between moving from Nebraska to northern Ontario and into the Middle Atlantic Coast near New York City. A second band originating from a band of thunderstorms across Missouri then traveled across the Great Lakes and the Northeast. A newly formed low pressure off the coast of New Jersey then moved across Maine and the Canadian Maritimes.

Areas of the Middle Plains and the lower Great Lakes including Des Moines, Chicago, Milwaukee, Detroit and Toronto received a significant wintry mix of precipitation before changing to rain and thunderstorms on December 1 and 2. Des Moines International Airport was shut down for several hours due to the icing conditions on runways and an American Airlines flight with 44 passengers slipped out of a taxiway while another skidded out of a runway at Madison, Wisconsin's Dane County Regional Airport. Numerous passengers were stranded for several hours at Chicago's O'Hare International Airport where 400 flights were canceled on December 1 alone. About 140,000 customers in Illinois alone lost power.

Portions of Wisconsin, Minnesota and northern Ontario received several inches of snow while the mountain regions of Colorado received as much as four feet of snow (120 cm), resulting in the postponement of the men's Super-G alpine skiing event in Beaver Creek, Colorado, where  was reported.

The storm was responsible for at least 16 deaths including three in Quebec, one in New York, one in Maine, one in Indiana, three in Wisconsin, two in Illinois, three in Michigan, one in Utah, and one in Colorado.

December 1–5 (Pacific Northwest to Middle-Atlantic)

Additionally, on December 1, a large storm off the Pacific Coast brought heavy snow to portions of British Columbia, including the South Coast and Vancouver Island, with amounts in higher elevations exceeding  and significant accumulations also for Metro Vancouver. The heavy rains caused a mudslide inside Stanley Park which closed its seawall which had just recently re-opened in November after it was heavily damaged during a major wind storm in December 2006. Coast Guard helicopters had to evacuate and saved over 100 residents who were trapped by the high water levels. Snowmelt was also caused floods to Washington. The town of Vernonia, Oregon was completely cut off by the water and mudslides. Wind gusts locally exceeded  with the highest gust registered at  recorded in Bay City, Oregon. Over 100,000 customers from northern California to Washington lost electricity while 40,000 lost power in British Columbia. In addition, Amtrak service between Portland, Oregon and Vancouver, British Columbia was disrupted for at least two days.

The storm was responsible for at least 10 deaths, including five in a single vehicle crash near Prince George, British Columbia where there was snow-covered roads. Three people were killed in Washington and two in Oregon. From the perspective of Chicago, the storm was viewed as an Alberta clipper with the potential for heavy snowfall. During the evening of December 2, the storm was reported to have a central pressure of 949 mb, pressures associated with a Category 3 hurricane.

The same storm entered the Upper Midwest as an Alberta clipper, which brought light to moderate snowfall over much of the Midwest on December 4 and early December 5, and overspread the Ohio Valley and Mid-Atlantic states on December 5.

December 9–17

A series of winter storms impacted widespread areas of North America over a nine-day period. From December 8 to December 11, another major ice storm impacted the midsection of the United States from Texas, northeast through the Midwest, through the Mid-Atlantic States, and into southern New England. At least 38 people were killed by the ice storms, including 23 in Oklahoma, four in Kansas, three in Missouri, and one in Nebraska. Most of the fatalities were the result of traffic accidents caused by the icy weather, including four people in a single accident on Interstate 40 west of Okemah, Oklahoma. The storm caused the largest power outage in Oklahoma history, where 600,000 homes and businesses lost power, while 350,000 customers were also without power in other states, including 100,000 in both Missouri and Kansas, and scattered power outages in Nebraska, Iowa, and Illinois. Overall, over 1.5 million customers lost power throughout the Central United States with some being without electricity for over one week. The storms caused widespread school and flight cancellations with Chicago O'Hare International Airport cancelling at least 560 flights, while Tulsa International Airport was forced to halt flights on the 10th after losing power for 10 hours.

The snow storm was responsible for at least 17 deaths across five states and three Canadian provinces as well as numerous flights and school cancellations from Michigan to the Canadian Maritimes.

December 18
After a mild start to the cold season, a large area of Spain was hit by its first winter storm of the season which brought heavy snow and rain as well as strong winds and much colder temperatures. In the eastern part of the country, several roads were closed due to high amounts of snow. Portions of a key road link between Madrid and Barcelona was also shut down due to the weather.

December 21–24
A new winter storm affected most of Central North America from the Texas Panhandle to northern Ontario while heavy rains, areas of freezing rain, very strong winds and warm temperatures affected most of Eastern North America. Up to a foot of snow fell across much of Minnesota, Wisconsin, and Michigan, and freezing rain was also reported in many areas. The winds caused 300 flights to be canceled at Chicago-O'Hare International Airport. Also in Chicago, crews reported that 170 signals had been knocked out and more than 500 reports of fallen limbs had been attributed to the storm. 11,000 customers in Wisconsin, 92,000 in Michigan and 225,000 in Illinois lost power. The storm was responsible for at least 25 deaths across seven US states and one Canadian province, including eight in Minnesota, three in Indiana, three in Wyoming, five in Wisconsin, one in Texas, one in Kansas, one in Michigan, and three in New Brunswick. In Texas, the fatal crash included 50 vehicles on Interstate 40 while in Kansas and Missouri crashes on Interstate 70 and Interstate 29 respectively also involved several vehicles. Lake-effect snows across the traditional snowbelt region in the Great Lakes also fell on Christmas Eve.

See also

Winter storm
Global storm activity of 2006
Lake Storm "Aphid"
November 2006 nor'easter
Madden–Julian oscillation
2007 African floods

References

External links
Current Watches and Warnings in Canada, courtesy of Environment Canada
February 2007 Lake Effect Snowstorm
"Summary of Lake Effect Snow Event over the Tug Hill February 3–12, 2007" – National Weather Service Buffalo office
List of NWS summaries of the March 1–2, 2007 winter storm event (courtesy of NWS Duluth)

Weather events
2007 meteorology
2007 natural disasters
Blizzards
Ice storms
Weather by year